Jordan Michael Catchpole  (born 5 October 1999) is a British Paralympic swimmer from Beccles. He won gold in the mixed  freestyle relay S14 at the 2020 Summer Paralympics. Diagnosed with autism, his coach is Tim Millett and he is a member of Team Waveney.

Catchpole was appointed Member of the Order of the British Empire (MBE) in the 2022 New Year Honours for services to swimming.

References

Living people
1999 births
Sportspeople with autism
People from Beccles
Paralympic swimmers of Great Britain
Paralympic gold medalists for Great Britain
Swimmers at the 2020 Summer Paralympics
Medalists at the 2020 Summer Paralympics
Medalists at the World Para Swimming Championships
Medalists at the World Para Swimming European Championships
Members of the Order of the British Empire
British male backstroke swimmers
British male freestyle swimmers
S14-classified Paralympic swimmers
Swimmers at the 2022 Commonwealth Games
Commonwealth Games competitors for England
21st-century British people